PAS-3, was a communications satellite for PanAmSat. Launched in December 1994.

Satellite description 
PAS-3 was constructed by Hughes Aircraft Corporation, based on the HS-601 satellite bus. Designed for an operational life of 15 years, the spacecraft was equipped with 20 C-band and 20 Ku-band transponders. Its two solar panels, which had a span of  generated 4.7 kW of power when the spacecraft first entered service, which was expected to drop to around 4.3 kW by the end of the vehicle's operational life.

Launch 
Arianespace launched PAS-3, using an Ariane 4 launch vehicle, flight number V70, in the Ariane 42P H10-3 configuration. The launch took place from ELA-2 at the Centre Spatial Guyanais, at Kourou in French Guiana, at 23:05:32 UTC on 8 July 1994. Failed to orbit.

References 

Intelsat satellites
Satellites using the BSS-601 bus
Communications satellites in geostationary orbit
Satellite television
Spacecraft launched in 1994